Steven Morales (born April 7, 1992) is a Puerto Rican male volleyball player who currently plays for Libyan club Alittihad Misurata SC. He is a member of the Puerto Rico men's national volleyball team since 2011.

References

External links
 profile at FIVB.org

1992 births
Living people
People from Mayagüez, Puerto Rico
Puerto Rican men's volleyball players
Place of birth missing (living people)